Tylosurus acus (keel-jawed needlefish) is a game fish of the family Belonidae.

Distribution
The keel-jawed needlefish is widespread in the Atlantic and Indo-Pacific oceans.

Taxonomy
There are four recognised subspecies of Tylosurus acus:

T. a. acus (Lacepède, 1803) (Agujon needlefish) - in the western Atlantic from Massachusetts to Brazil and in the eastern Atlantic off Morocco and in the western Mediterranean
T. a. imperialis (Rafinesque, 1810) in the Mediterranean Sea and Cape Verde Islands
T. a. rafale Collette and Parin 1970 (Atlantic agujon needlefish) Gulf of Guinea
T. a melanotus (Bleeker, 1850) (Keel-jawed needlefish) in the Indo-West Pacific and oceanic islands in the eastern tropical Pacific Revillagigedo Islands, Clipperton Island, and Cocos Island.

Tylosurus pacificus was once considered a subspecies of T. acus but is now considered a distinct species. Although acus was suppressed by ICZN Opinion 900, continued usage of the name led to Tylosurus acus being reinstated as a valid name. Some authorities raise the four subspecies to species level.

References

External links

acus
Pantropical fish
Taxa named by Bernard Germain de Lacépède
Fish described in 1803